"I Would Be Over Me Too" is a song co-written and recorded by Canadian country music artist Tyler Joe Miller. The track was co-written with Kelly Archer and Mitch Merrett. The song became the second single off Miller's debut extended play Sometimes I Don't, But Sometimes I Do.

Critical reception
CMT stated:

Commercial performance
"I Would Be Over Me Too" reached a peak of #1 on the Billboard Canada Country chart dated October 31, 2020. This made Miller the first independent artist in the history of the chart to debut with consecutive #1 singles (after "Pillow Talkin'"), and gave him his first chart-topper as a songwriter. The song also reached a peak of #63 on the Canadian Hot 100 in the same week. It has been certified Gold by Music Canada.

Music video
The music video for "I Would Be Over Me Too" premiered on September 17, 2020. It features Miller singing the song while continuously running into an ex who never seems to notice him.

Charts

Certifications

References

2020 songs
2020 singles
Tyler Joe Miller songs
Songs written by Kelly Archer
Songs written by Mitch Merrett
Songs written by Tyler Joe Miller
Song recordings produced by Danick Dupelle